An election of the President of the Senate of the Czech Republic was held on 16 December 2000. Petr Pithart was elected the new President of the Senate.

Background and voting
Four-Coalition was successful in 2000 senate election. Four-Coalition decided to nominate its candidate for the Senate President. Christian and Democratic Union – Czechoslovak People's Party suggested Petr Pithart or Zuzana Roithová. Freedom Union supported Josef Zieleniec and Civic Democratic Alliance suggested Josef Jařab. Four-Coalition eventually nominated Pithart. Pithart narrowly beaten Zieleniec in a voting within Four-Coalition Senate faction.

Election was held on 19 December 2000. Pithart was the only candidate. He received 50 votes of 79.

References

President of the Senate of the Czech Republic election
1996
President of the Senate of the Czech Republic election